CenturyLink Center may refer to:
CenturyLink Center Omaha, a former name of an arena in Omaha, Nebraska now known as CHI Health Center Omaha
CenturyLink Center (Bossier City), arena located in Bossier City, Louisiana